Jhang City railway station is located in Jhang city of Punjab province, Pakistan on the Shorkot–Lalamusa Branch Line. This railway station is the stop of only few trains. Jhang Sadar railway station is the principal railway station of the Jhang city.

See also
 List of railway stations in Pakistan
 Pakistan Railways

References

External links

Railway stations in Jhang District
Railway stations on Shorkot–Lalamusa Branch Line